Jacob Masen (28 March 1606 - 27 September 1681) was a German Jesuit priest, historian, dramatist and theologian. He is known as a prolific writer in Latin.

Life
He was born at Dahlen in Jülich, and studied in Cologne. Having entered the Order of Jesus in 1629, he taught poetry and rhetoric in the Lower Rhine region. After theological studies he was ordained priest between 1639 and 1641. On the 3 May 1648 he took his final vows in Cologne. where he also acted as a preacher. He also acted in Paderborn and Trier.  He died, aged 75, in Cologne.

Works
He completed a substantial antiquarian work on Trier by Christoph Brouwer.

His epic poem Sarcotis (1654) became notorious in the 18th century, after William Lauder alleged that John Milton had plagiarised it in writing Paradise Lost.

With Jacob Bidermann, he was one of the most important Jesuit dramatists influencing German drama.

Notes

Further reading
Richard Dimler, Jakob Masen's Imago figurata From Theory to Practice. Emblematica Vol. 6(2) 1992, 283-306.

External links
 http://www.kirchenlexikon.de/m/masen_j.shtml

1606 births
1681 deaths
17th-century German Jesuits
German poets
German male poets
German male dramatists and playwrights
17th-century German dramatists and playwrights
17th-century German male writers